Kedara Kamodi is a rāga belonging to the tradition of Odissi music. Falling under the meḷa Sri, the raga uses both nisada swaras and is traditionally associated with the srungāra rasa. This raga is considered a conjunct of the rāgas Kedāra and Kamodi. The raga has been used by most of the famous composers including Kabi Samrata Upendra Bhanja and Kabisurjya Baladeba Ratha.

Structure 
An ancient raga, Kedara Kamodi has been used by hundreds of poet-composers for well-over the past many centuries. The raga is bakra in its aroha and abaroha (ascent and descent). Its aroha-abaroha are given below :

Aroha : S M G R, G M P D n D P, P N S

Abaroha : S n D P M G R S

The raga exhibits Kedarānga in its SMGM and PNS, whereas PDSnDP and GMPDnDP evoke the Kamodi anga.

Compositions 
Some of the well-known traditional compositions in this raga include :

 Khyamanukampadhara He (Champu) by Kabisurjya Baladeba Ratha
 Ramanibara Asuchi Kari Bhangi (Rasa Panchaka) by Kabi Samrata Upendra Bhanja
 Jebe Nabaghana Syama Bansiswana by Kabisurjya Baladeba Ratha

References 

Ragas of Odissi music